Burgedin is a village in Powys, Wales. The Montgomery Canal passes through the village.

External links 
Photos of Burgedin and surrounding area on geograph

Villages in Powys